Luo Xian Xiang ( Mandarin: Luo Xian Xiang, Cantonese: Law Hin-Cheung) (1890–1968) was a World War II Chinese general.  He was a soldier, and at times, as regional government official; he established anti-corruption policies and conducted administrative and education reforms.  He was born in Sihui, Guangdong Province, where Cantonese is the native tongue.

Name
His scholarly family chose to name him 獻祥, literally meant "dedication and harmony". He was to live a life devoted to harmony. As in the tradition dated back to Confucius’ time, when Luo Xian Xiang became of age, his name was added into the Law clan registry
, and at the same time, a second name was added - 次黎, Chi-Lai Cantonese. While this second name literally meant "second to the peasants", for him, it was to serve his country with humility.

Early years
Luo Xian Xiang was the second of six children, and the second son of a well off, landed gentry.  His father, a scholar from the Qing Dynasty, opened a primary school for the local children.  This same school was where Luo Xian Xiang obtained his initial schooling.  Later, his father left to work as an educator in Foshan 佛山 for many years. The family's experience and connection to education were instrumental to Luo Xian Xiang's later successes in education and other reforms. In 1908, Luo Xian Xiang enrolled in the Guangdong Army Primary School; followed by Nanjing Army Middle School, to graduation in June 1916, from the Baoding Military Academy-Cavalry Division. Upon graduation, he was commissioned to serve under Chen Jiongming, the Governor and General of the Guangdong Army.
 
During this time, the establishment of the Republic of China was far from complete, with many generals and warlords fighting either for self interests or for their ideals of forming a Democratic Republic. In the south, the armies were loosely united under Sun Yat Sen/.

In 1918, Luo Xian Xiang was appointed Adjutant Commander for the fourth Guangdong Army, head of the 17th command. In 1920, he was Brigade Commander of the Independent third Army.

June 16, 1922 Incident

To unite China under one central government, the southern armies needed to defeat the northern armies. However, on-going warfare amongst the different factions; between the northern and the Guangdong or southern armies led to great casualties and miseries to the civilians.

Within the southern armies, there were serious discords amongst the generals, Sun Yat Sen, and those who supported him.  Of all the differing factors, a couple stood out. For example, Sun Yat Sen believed in a centralized government and mandated that all generals must pledge allegiance to him. This request was counter to the idea of democracy, thus, many generals balked in taking part. This included Guangdong Governor and Commander in Chief Chen Jiongming who wanted to implement a federalist type of governance with Guangdong as a model province. In Guangdong, when he was in control, he established policies against corruption, nepotism, while championed woman's rights, banned and burned heroin. All Chen's reforms, however, were eventually abolished after Sun gained control of Guangdong in 1925.

In April 1922, Chen Jiongming was discharged when he refused to embark on a “Northern Expedition”; Sun's attempt to defeat the Northern Army in order to unite the country.  On June 16, 1922, unable to accept Sun Yat Sen's leadership, Chen Jiongming's subordinate Yip Ku 葉舉 ordered the arrest of Sun Yat Sen.  Luo Xian Xiang was tasked to carry out this order. However, the plan was leaked and Sun escaped to a warship 永豐艦; from where Sun rallied his base. In history, this was known as 6.16 Incident. After Sun's departure, Chen Jiongming returned to govern Guangdong Province.

Meanwhile, Sun sent for Chiang Kai-shek to join him in the struggle. The 16 June Incident propelled Chiang Kai-shek to prominence and power within the Kuomintang (KMT) of China. On January 4, 1923, Sun waged war against Guangdong where Chen was based. With the help from two armies, Sun was able to attack Chen from the east and from the west. On January 15, Chen left Guangdong, relocating to Waizhou 惠州 where he stayed. On February 21, Sun returned to Guangzhou, and from May 28, 1923, to October 27, Sun's forces attacked Waizhou without any conclusive results. By 1924, Chen's armies were able to resist the invading forces and both sides fought to a standstill. As a Brigade Commander, Luo Xian Xiang fought in these conflicts on the side of Chen's Guangdong Army.
 
In 1924, Sun Yat Sen bombed Guangzhou, Seikwan District 广州西关屠城事件 causing massive destruction of properties and civilian lives.  From the cruelty exhibited in this Guangzhou Seikwan Incident, the people of Guangdong became supportive of Chen Jiongming, who was in the process of planning counterattacks. However, what Chen did not realize was that Sun had accepted Russian aid; the same aid which he had refused on grounds that he did not want to be beholden to a communist country. Further, Sun had joined forces with the Chinese communists, who were gaining strength.  With more advance munitions, Sun's army together with the communist forces, under Chiang Kai-shek gained the upper hand.

Towards the end of 1925, with the participation of Russia and Chinese communists, Sun was victorious.  Chen escaped and spent his remaining years in poverty in Hong Kong. Chen's army was disbanded and absorbed into Chiang's forces.

1925 to 1939
From 1925 – 1928, Luo Xian Xiang was Regiment Commander for the 14th Army and The Guangdong Police and Defense Regiments in Chiang's army, where he suppressed militant gangs, bringing law and order to the region.

In April 1928, Luo Xian Xiang was Police Commissioner for Nanhi County 南海县.

With the unification of the south, The KMT's Republic of China was established on July 1, 1925, in Guangzhou, Guangdong Province, four months after Sun Yat-Sen's death, in March of that same year.

Luo was appointed Special Envoy and Chief Inspector for Guangdong Province in April 1930. By 1932, Luo became County Magistrate for Yangshan 陽山, and years later, Luo was the Mayor of Shantou 汕头市长. 
  
With the start of the Japanese invasion in 1937, China needed new armies. This led to the massing of armed forces in a hurry. During this time and, through 1938, Luo Xian Xiang was in Guangdong carrying out reforms in education, administration, law, and political affairs. In 1939, Luo returned to active duty, joined the 12th Army Group as senior officer.

The 66th Army

In 1937 January, with the Japanese invasion in earnest, The 66th Army was formed by incorporating 159th and 160th Divisions. Yip Sui 葉肇 and Division Commander, Chan Kai 陈骥 led The 66th Army with distinction.  Of note was the Battle of Wuhan in 1938 where The 66th Army participated.  Holding out for ten months in bitter defensive warfare with heavy casualties, the Chinese forces were able to inflict unacceptable losses to the Japanese, ended with a strategic victory. Later In 1938, The 66th Army engaged the enemies in two fronts. The 160th Division won the Battle of Kamlunfan 金輪峰 while the 159th Division was victorious in Battle of Wanjialing.

On November 15, 1939, Japanese forces landed on Yimzhouwan 欽州灣; by November 24, the Japanese invaded Nan-ning 南寧. As the Chinese Army was spread over a few fronts, The 66th Army was summoned to defend Kunlunkwan 昆仑关.  At the time, the 66th Army was in the process of reformation due to heavy losses from prior battles, and did not have sufficient manpower to staff the divisions. So, in December 1939, Yip Sui from Divisional Headquarters, borrowed Luo Xian Xiang
 from the 12th Army Group, to be the Senior Advisor and Chief of Staff for the 159th Division.  
 
However, due to lack of coordination and miscommunications, The 66th  was unable to hold Kunlunkwan 昆仑关. This defeat led to the demotions of two generals, and court martial for a couple of brigade commanders. The 66th was reconstituted; continued to actively participate in driving the Japanese out of China and southeast Asia. This KMT army lasted till 1949 when the Communists overran the Republic of China of Chiang Kai-shek, who retreated to Taiwan.

Post-1940
After a brief stint with The 66th in 1939, Luo Xian Xiang returned to Guangdong in 1940 to become the Senior Advisor of The #7 war zone. In 1942, Guangdong #4 Administrative Zone Special Envoy Chan Kai 陈骥 was reassigned.  Luo Xian Xiang assumed the post as Special Envoy and Chief Commander for Security of The 4th Administrative Zone in Guangdong, where he initiated and successfully completed major administration reforms. Later, Luo was Special Administrative Commissioner and Security Commander for The 10th Administrative Zone, Guangdong Province.

Japanese surrender in Guangdong 
In 1944 June, Luo Xian Xiang was appointed Divisional Commander of Wailun District 惠龍師官區. On September 11, 1945, Lui Pei-Nan 缪培南 accompanied by Luo Xian Xiang and others accepted the unconditional surrender from the Japanese in Guangdong. After serving as Special Commissioner for The 10th Administration Zone, Guangdong Province, Luo Xian Xiang retired in 1946.

During this time, the civil war between Kuomintang and the Communists Party, later known as the Republic Of China (Taiwan) and the People's Republic of China, respectively, continued unabated.

Defeat of Kuomintang/Republic of China
By 1949 October, the People's Republic of China Communists army took Guangzhou. Even though at the time Luo Xian Xiang was the County Chief of Sihui 四會縣縣長, as a retired General of the Republic of China, who in earlier years was commended for routing the communists, the communists wanted to capture him.

When the communists continued to march on to win territory after territory, Luo Xian Xiang left for Hong Kong, where he lived a spartan, quiet life. He died of illness in 1968 at the age of 78.

Obituary and eulogy

In Chinese tradition, one year was added to the year of birth, and to the year of death, thus resulting age became 80, as reported in the newspaper.

References

Chinese Characters Sets
Chinese characters are complicated and depending on how the string of characters is put together, the meaning can be quite different. Post 1950, to speed up the education of the masses, People's Republic of China has implemented a Simplified Chinese characters set of over 2,300 characters. This is a version with less stokes per character, taken from the entire pool of the more complex tradition Chinese characters. The easier to learn simplified version covered the needs for written communication in the daily life of the general public.

Footnotes

1890 births
1968 deaths
Chinese military personnel of World War II
Chinese people of World War II
National Revolutionary Army generals from Guangdong
People from Zhaoqing